Student governments in the United States exist in both secondary and higher education. At the collegiate level, the most common name is Student Government, according to the American Student Government Association's database of all student governments throughout the United States. The next most common name is the student government association. Other names are student senate, associated students (west coast institutions almost exclusively), or less commonly students' union. There was one instance of a government of the student body, at Iowa State University. At Yale University, the undergraduate student government is known as the Yale College Council. High school student governments usually are known as Student Council.

Student governments vary widely in their internal structure and degree of influence on institutional policy.  At institutions with large graduate, medical school, and individual "college" populations, there are often student governments that serve those specific constituencies.  Some student governments have very large budgets; the student government at the University of California at Los Angeles (UCLA) had an annual budget of $39 million as of 2013, and the Florida International University Student Government had an annual budget of $20.3 million as of 2021.

Elsewhere in the world, student governments are often known as "student unions". However, in American English, the phrase "student union" often refers to a "student activity center" (also known as a "student center" or "student commons"): a building with dining halls, game rooms, lounges, student offices, and other spaces for student activities.

Not all American colleges and universities have a separate student government.  A handful of small liberal arts colleges in the United States use a governance model in which key decisions are made democratically by the community as a whole, with students and faculty on equal footing.  Examples of such schools include Marlboro College, Shimer College, and College of the Atlantic. In addition, historically, many US schools followed a "student-faculty council" model, with governance shared between elected representatives of the student body and the faculty.

Structures

Many student governments are structured similarly to the federal government of the United States, consisting of distinct executive, legislative, and judicial branches. These structures often include elements which are not found in the federal government (e.g. legislative veto, programming branches, initiative, recall, referendum). Just like the federal government, these governments have the trappings of a presidential system, with a separation of powers between branches and a presidential veto. This is by far the most common type of structure, and is found in model student government constitutions and by-laws. Most executive branch officers are elected institution-wide, while some community and technical colleges, because of poor turnout, have resorted to choosing leaders from campus clubs and organizations.

The vast majority of student governments operate under a two branch system, with an executive and legislative branch. The judicial branch is far less common, but frequently exists at public colleges and universities.

Examples
Many institutions with significant graduate, law, and medical school programs have separate student governments for the graduate and undergraduate student bodies. Similarly, multiple undergraduate student governments sometimes form to address specific facets of university decision-making. At the University of Texas, for example, students are served by three equal and independent student governance organizations: the Student Government represents students generally, but focuses on undergraduate student life matters; the Senate of College Councils represents undergraduate and graduate students in academic affairs; and the Graduate Student Assembly represents graduate students in both academic and student affairs. While some student governments incorporate undergraduates and graduates together, at the University of Oklahoma, for example, the legislature is bicameral: The Graduate Student Senate and the Undergraduate Student Congress. Florida Atlantic University, with multiple campuses, elects a university-wide student government president, then elects campus "governors" and representatives serving each specific campus.

Responsibilities
Within their capacity as representatives of the student body, student governments may fulfill a range of responsibilities, such as:
 Representing the interests and concerns of the student body (authority granted by the institution's leadership)
 Serving on and/or appointing representatives to serve on institution-wide committees made up of students, faculty, administrators, and staff members, the ultimate being voting student representation on the board of trustees/regents/visitors
 Disbursing mandatory fees for student activities to clubs, organizations, and campus offices
 Sponsoring campus-wide programs (e.g. Homecoming, concerts, parades, speakers, entertainment, discount cards, food pantries, book swaps, etc.)
 Chartering and regulating student organizations
 Lobbying on local and state education-related issues, particularly at public institutions

Relationship to the Institution
Most universities and colleges (both public and private) in the United States are governed by a Board of Trustees, Regents or Visitors. Only about 20 percent of all Student Governments have a student serving as a voting member of the Board of Trustees/Regents/Governors, according to ASGA's Student Representatives on Board of Trustees Survey from November 2013. Nearly 64 percent of nearly 400 participating institutions of all types and size indicated that they have a student member of their institution's board of trustees/regents. Of those 64 percent that have a student member, 40.83% have a student who has an official vote.

Student governments tend to be chartered by the Board but, in the case of public universities operated by a State, may be recognized by the state legislature. Their structure, purpose and responsibilities are usually established in a constitution ratified by the student body. Some states, such as California and Florida, specifically provide for "student body organizations" in their public institutions by statute.  (e.g. Cal Education Code § 76060 (Community Colleges); Cal Education Code § 89300 (Universities)).

Student governments have historically been considered auxiliaries of the university to which they belong. Since ultimate responsibility over the direction of a university is usually vested in a Chancellor or President appointed by the Board, some conflicts may arise between Student Government and the institution's administration, especially in the area of fiscal matters. In addition to a student government, many institutions also establish governments for faculty (e.g. Faculty Senate) and staff (e.g. Staff Assembly). In such cases, there occasionally exist links and dependencies between these bodies. Many colleges/universities also allow the student governments to manage and disburse the student activities (student life) funds generated by the fees students pay each quarter/semester/year. This usually establishes some authority for the student government because control over money is power and strong influence.

Some of the student governments of prominent American universities have a history of social activism against their campus and act as independent organizations, the most notable of which being the Associated Students of the University of California which gained international attention during the Free Speech Movement at UC Berkeley. The organization was and continues to be composed of campus political parties that represent a wide range of political ideologies, like SLATE, whose members composed the leadership of the movement.

Student government budgets range from as high as $90 million (UCLA) to less than a few thousand dollars. Large public residential universities tend to enjoy the largest operational budgets, while commuter-based public colleges and private colleges tend to have the smallest budgets. The vast majority of student governments receive their funding from a portion of the student activity fees. More than 71 percent of American "SG" officers are compensated through salaries, stipends, scholarships, and tuition waivers, according to the SG Salary Survey. The American Student Government Association, the professional association for collegiate student governments, maintains an annually updated database of student government information including budgets, number of members, salaries, structure, and number of recognized clubs.

According to ASGA's SG Database, here are the national average student government budgets for different types of institutions:
Community/Junior Colleges-- $263,330.43
Private Colleges/Universities (religious)-- $176.164.19
Private Colleges/Universities (secular)-- $356,466.09
Public College/Universities-- $1,614,130.57

Totalled, ASGA estimates Student Governments to have more than $2 billion.

Most American student governments are "official, on-campus organizations" recognized by their institutions. But particularly in California, Minnesota, and Oregon, the "Associated Students, Inc." are non-profit corporations that operate independently of the institution, yet remain beholden to institution rules and regulations. They sometimes derive part of their funding through the sale of services such as "discount cards" that students can use at local establishments.

Average voter turnout in all 4,700 student governments nationwide is in the range of 4 percent, according to the ASGA SG database. This number is negatively skewed by poor participation overall in SG at the more than 2,000 American community and technical colleges which have larger commuter and non-traditional populations and therefore have less emphasis on traditional student services and programs such as student government. State universities and colleges tend to have a 10-15 percent voter turnout, while private colleges tend to be 15-20 percent, but can have much higher totals, sometimes into 40 percent or higher, according to ASGA. Online voting is used by 72% of American student governments, according to ASGA's 2012 SG Elections nationwide research study.

Among 2017-18 student body presidents, according to ASGA's database which is updated annually, 48.62% are women and 51.38% are men.

The ethnic percentages are:
30.41% non-Hispanic men
26.24% non-Hispanic women
10.27% Hispanic women
8.34% African-American men
7.01% African-American women
6.51% Hispanic men
2.44% Asian women
2.23% Asian men

Among women student body presidents
53.97% non-Hispanic women
21.12% Hispanic women
14.43% African American women
5.02% Asian women

Among men student body presidents
59.20 non-Hispanic men
16.23% African-American men
12.67% Hispanic men
4.35% Asian men

The vast majority of student government leaders serve one-year terms by the constitution/bylaws. There sometimes are student body presidents who serve more than one year. Steve Wymer served two full years and part of a third as student body president at Washington State University.

In popular culture
Mr. Student Body President, an original series on go90
 Madam President is also the proper term for a female student President.

See also
Conference on Student Government Associations
American Student Government Association
Fraternities and sororities
The Machine (social group)

References

External links
Student Government Conferences
Student Government Resource Center